Laurent Fargues (born 19 July 1975 in Cagnes-sur-Mer) is a French mathematician working in number theory and arithmetic geometry.

Fargues was an invited speaker at the International Congress of Mathematicians in 2018 in Rio de Janeiro.

Career 
From 2002 to 2011, Fargues was a chargé de recherches at the CNRS in Orsay, from 2011 to 2013 he was CNRS research director at the IRMA in Strasbourg and, from 2013, CNRS research director at the l'Institut de mathématiques de Jussieu in Paris (a campus of the Sorbonne University).

Fargues work mainly centers around the study of Shimura varieties, p-divisible groups and their moduli spaces, and p-adic Hodge theory. One of his most significant contributions has been to link the local Langlands correspondence with the Fargues–Fontaine curve, an object introduced by Fargues together with Jean-Marc Fontaine. In particular, Fargues has formulated a general geometric conjecture which refines the classical local Langlands conjecture, and at the same time introduces extra structure which mirrors the more categorical formulation of the geometric Langlands conjecture. These works were (in part) the subject of a Séminaire Bourbaki exposé in 2018 by Matthew Morrow and an Arbeitsgemeinschaft meeting at Oberwolfach in 2016. His work with Peter Scholze on the stack of vector bundles on the Fargues–Fontaine curve is expected to have implications for the construction of a local Langlands correspondence for general groups.

Fargues gave the Peccot course at the Collège de France in the spring of 2004, was awarded the  Petit d'Ormoy, Carriere, Thebault prize from the French academy of sciences in 2009, and was an invited speaker at the International Congress of Mathematicians 2018 in Rio de Janeiro in both the number theory and  algebraic geometry sessions.

References 

1975 births
Living people
Research directors of the French National Centre for Scientific Research